John Mwathiwa (born 1 March 1967 in Zomba) is a Malawian long distance runner.

He represented Malawi at the 1988, 1992 and 1996 Summer Olympics as well as at the 1991, 1993 and 1995 World Championships. He never qualified for the final round.

Achievements

External links

1967 births
Living people
People from Zomba District
Malawian male long-distance runners
Athletes (track and field) at the 1988 Summer Olympics
Athletes (track and field) at the 1992 Summer Olympics
Athletes (track and field) at the 1996 Summer Olympics
Olympic athletes of Malawi
Athletes (track and field) at the 1990 Commonwealth Games
Athletes (track and field) at the 1994 Commonwealth Games
Athletes (track and field) at the 1998 Commonwealth Games
Commonwealth Games competitors for Malawi
Athletes (track and field) at the 1999 All-Africa Games
African Games competitors for Malawi